Events from the year 1956 in Canada.

Incumbents

Crown 
 Monarch – Elizabeth II

Federal government 
 Governor General – Vincent Massey
 Prime Minister – Louis St. Laurent
 Chief Justice – Patrick Kerwin (Ontario)
 Parliament – 22nd

Provincial governments

Lieutenant governors 
Lieutenant Governor of Alberta – John J. Bowlen
Lieutenant Governor of British Columbia – Frank Mackenzie Ross 
Lieutenant Governor of Manitoba – John Stewart McDiarmid 
Lieutenant Governor of New Brunswick – David Laurence MacLaren 
Lieutenant Governor of Newfoundland – Leonard Outerbridge 
Lieutenant Governor of Nova Scotia – Alistair Fraser 
Lieutenant Governor of Ontario – Louis Orville Breithaupt 
Lieutenant Governor of Prince Edward Island – Thomas William Lemuel Prowse 
Lieutenant Governor of Quebec – Gaspard Fauteux
Lieutenant Governor of Saskatchewan – William John Patterson

Premiers 
Premier of Alberta – Ernest Manning
Premier of British Columbia – W.A.C. Bennett 
Premier of Manitoba – Douglas Campbell
Premier of New Brunswick – Hugh John Flemming
Premier of Newfoundland – Joey Smallwood 
Premier of Nova Scotia – Henry Hicks (until November 20) then Robert Stanfield 
Premier of Ontario – Leslie Frost 
Premier of Prince Edward Island – Alex Matheson 
Premier of Quebec – Maurice Duplessis 
Premier of Saskatchewan – Tommy Douglas

Territorial governments

Commissioners 
 Commissioner of Yukon – Frederick Howard Collins 
 Commissioner of Northwest Territories – Robert Gordon Robertson

Events
February 10 – Wilbert Coffin is hanged
May 1 – The Trades and Labour Congress of Canada merges with the Canadian Congress of Labour to form the Canadian Labour Congress.
May 8 – The controversial bill to create the TransCanada pipeline is introduced in the House of Commons.
May 15 – A CF-100 crashes into a Grey Nuns convent outside of Ottawa killing fifteen.
June 20 – Saskatchewan election: Tommy Douglas's Co-operative Commonwealth Federation wins a fourth consecutive majority
September 30 – Winnipeg connects to TransCanada Telephone System's microwave radio relay via MTS, bringing same day programming from CBC Television.
November 1 – The second Springhill Mining Disaster occurs killing 39.
November 4 – Lester B. Pearson proposes a successful resolution to the Suez Crisis, this will win him a Nobel Peace Prize.
November 20 – Robert Stanfield becomes premier of Nova Scotia, replacing Henry Hicks
December 9 – Trans-Canada Air Lines Flight 810 (9), a Canadair Northstar, crashes on Slesse Mountain near Chilliwack during heavy weather.  The plane carried five members of the Saskatchewan Roughriders and Winnipeg Blue Bombers and fans on their way home from an all-star game in Vancouver.  Bodies were not found until the following late summer due to severe terrain and high altitude and unknown location of the crash.  This was one of the worst civilian air disasters in the world at the time.
December 14 – John Diefenbaker is elected leader of the Progressive Conservative Party of Canada.
René Lévesque begins hosting Point de Mire

Sport 
March 15 - Whipper Billy Watson (William John Potts) becomes the first Canadian to hold the World Heavyweight Wrestling Championship by defeating Lou Thesz in Toronto
April 10 - The Montreal Canadiens win their 8th Stanley Cup championship by defeating the Detroit Red Wings 4 games to 1. The deciding Game 5 was played at the Montreal Forum
May 6 - The Ontario Hockey Association's Toronto Marlboros won their third (and second consecutive) Memorial Cup by defeating the Saskatchewan Junior Hockey League's Regina Pats 4 games to 0 (with 1 tie). All games at Maple Leaf Gardens in Toronto
November 24 - The Edmonton Eskimos win their third (consecutive) Grey Cup by defeating the Montreal Alouettes by the score of 50 to 27 in the 44th Grey Cup played at Varsity Stadium in Toronto

Arts and literature

New books
Milton Acorn – In Love and Anger
Pierre Berton – The Mysterious North
Max Aitken – Men and Power
Leonard Cohen – Let Us Compare Mythologies
Harold Innis – Essays in Canadian Economic History
Farley Mowat – Lost in the Barrens

Awards
 See 1956 Governor General's Awards for a complete list of winners and finalists for those awards.
Stephen Leacock Award: Eric Nicol, Shall We Join The Ladies'''

Music
Walter Susskind replaces Sir Ernest MacMillan as the director of the Toronto Symphony Orchestra.
Pianist Glenn Gould tours the Soviet Union

Births

January to March
January 6 – Peter Stoffer, politician
January 7 – Mike Liut, ice hockey player and coach
January 9 – Gregory Dewar, politician
January 28 – David Faurschou, politician
February 28 – Guy Maddin, screenwriter and film director
February 29 – Steve Ashton, politician
February 29 – Bob Speller, politician (d. 2021)

April to June
April 4 – Evelyn Hart, ballet dancer
April 6 - Normand Corbeil, composer (Double Jeopardy, Extreme Ops, The Statement, V'') (d. 2013)
April 10 – Thomas Graham, volleyball player
May 7 – Jean Lapierre, television broadcaster, politician and Minister (d. 2016)
May 9 – Wendy Crewson, actress
May 15 – Ian Clyde, boxer
May 19 – James Gosling, software developer, father of the Java programming language
May 29 – Claude Drouin, politician
June 10 – Hugh McMillan, musician
June 11 – Simon Plouffe, mathematician and academic
June 11 – Arthur Porter,  physician and academic (d. 2015)
June 15 – David Iftody, politician (d. 2001)
June 15 – Dan Thompson, swimmer
June 18 – Oliver Schroer, fiddler, composer and music producer (d. 2008)
June 22 – Blake Debassige, artist

July to September
July 8 – Terry Puhl, baseball player
July 10 - Robert Ing, forensic scientist and author 
July 15 – Barry Melrose, ice hockey player, coach and commentator
July 17 – Bryan Trottier, ice hockey player
July 20 - Jim Prentice, politician, Premier of Alberta 2014–2015 (d. 2016)
August 5 - Jerry Ciccoritti, director
August 7 – Paul Williams, long-distance runner
August 12 – Bruce Greenwood, actor

October to December
October 5 – Brad Farrow, judoka
October 7 – Brian Sutter, ice hockey player and coach
October 17 – Sheela Basrur, medical doctor and Chief Medical Officer of Health in Ontario (d.2008)
October 23 – Geoffrey Kelly, musician
October 24 – Chris Clarke, boxer
December 10 – Marie Bountrogianni, politician and Minister
December 31 – Paul Zed, lawyer, professor and politician

Deaths

January to June
January 6 – Albert James Bradshaw, politician (b. 1882)
January 12 – Sam Langford, boxer (b. 1886)
February 14 – Aylesworth Perry, 6th Commissioner of the Royal Canadian Mounted Police (b. 1860)
March 10 – Vere Ponsonby, 9th Earl of Bessborough, businessman, politician and Governor General of Canada (b. 1880)
March 30 – Joseph W. Noseworthy, politician (b. 1888)
March 30 – Thomas Dufferin Pattullo, politician and 22nd Premier of British Columbia (b. 1873)

July to December
August 4 – Joseph Georges Bouchard, politician (b. 1888)
September 11 – Billy Bishop, First World War flying ace (b. 1894)
September 15 – Charles Dow Richards, judge, politician and 18th Premier of New Brunswick (b. 1879)
September 18 – Adélard Godbout, politician and 15th Premier of Quebec (b. 1892)
October 7 – Maud Allan, actor, dancer and choreographer (b. 1873)
November 18 – Clarence Chant, astronomer and physicist (b. 1865)
December 3 – Matthew Halton, radio and television journalist (b. 1904)
December 7 – Huntley Gordon, actor (b. 1887)

See also
 List of Canadian films

References

 
Years of the 20th century in Canada
Canada
1956 in North America